J. W. Coop is a 1972 American Western film set in the world of the modern American rodeo circuit. It stars and was directed by Cliff Robertson who also co-produced and co-scripted the film. Featuring footage from actual rodeo events, it was made with the cooperation of the Rodeo Cowboys Association (which became the Professional Rodeo Cowboys Association in 1975).

Plot
J.W. Coop is an ex-convict making up for lost time. His dream is to be the best rodeo cowboy, and the film follows his competitions on the circuit. He drives a converted ambulance and sleeps outdoors. Along the way, he meets a hippie girl named Bean, who joins him on the rodeo circuit. 

As Coop's winnings grow, he and Bean are able to start sleeping in hotels, and Coop starts dreaming about settling down on a ranch. Bean is too independent to share his domestic dreams, but she loves sharing in Coop's journey. 

At the national competition, Coop places second and breaks his leg. To Coop, second place is as good as last. The film ends with him riding a particularly vicious bull with his leg still in a cast. Coop stays on for the full 8 seconds, but his hand remains caught in the rope, preventing him from dismounting. The bull tosses him around and gores him. The film ends with Coop bleeding heavily on the side of the arena.

Cast
 Cliff Robertson as J.W. Coop
 Geraldine Page as Mama
 Cristina Ferrare as Bean
 R. G. Armstrong as Jim Sawyer
 R. L. Armstrong as Tooter Watson
 John Crawford as Rancher
 Wade Crosby as Billy Sol Gibbs
 Marjorie Durant Dye as Big Marge
 Paul Harper as Warden Morgan
 Son Hooker as Motorcycle Cop
 Richard Kennedy as Sheriff
 Bruce Kirby as Diesel Tanker Driver
 Larry Mahan as Himself
 Lowell D. Smith as Flankman (Golden State Rodeo Co.)

Critical reception
Stanley Kauffmann of The New Republic described J. W. Coop as "poor." Writing in the New York Times, Vincent Canby found the film to be "very fine, almost elegiac."

References

External links

1972 films
1972 Western (genre) films
American Western (genre) films
Films directed by Cliff Robertson
Rodeo in film
Columbia Pictures films
1970s English-language films
1970s American films